Vasily Iosifovich Stalin (surname since 9 January 1962 Dzhugashvili, ; 24 March 1921 – 19 March 1962) was the son of Joseph Stalin by his second wife, Nadezhda Alliluyeva. He joined the Air Force when Nazi Germany launched Operation Barbarossa, the invasion of the Soviet Union, in 1941. After the war, he held a few command posts. After his father died in 1953, Vasily lost his authority, developed a severe alcohol problem, and was ultimately arrested and sent to prison. He was later granted clemency, though he spent the remainder of his life between imprisonment and hospitalization until he died in 1962.

Early life
Vasily was born on 24 March 1921, the son of Joseph Stalin and Nadezhda Alliluyeva. He had an older half-brother, Yakov Dzhugashvili (born 1907), from his father's first marriage to Kato Svanidze, and a younger sister, Svetlana, was born in 1926. The family also took in Artyom Sergeyev, the son of Fyodor Sergeyev, a close friend of Joseph. Fyodor died in an accident four months after the birth of Artyom, so the boy was raised in the Stalin household.

As his mother was interested in pursuing a professional career, a nanny, Alexandra Bychokova, was hired to look after Stalin and Svetlana. On 9 November 1932 Vasily's mother shot herself. To conceal the suicide, the children were told that Alliluyeva had died of peritonitis, a complication from appendicitis. It would be 10 years before they learned the truth of their mother's death. Svetlana would later write that the death of their mother had a profound impact on her brother. She noted that he started to drink alcohol at the age of 13, and in drunken episodes would curse and attack her. He also became increasingly violent, especially towards Svetlana, and would be quite disruptive at Zubalovo, a dacha outside Moscow that was his primary residence.

Starting from the death of Alliluyeva, Joseph Stalin ceased to visit his children; only the nursemaid and head of Stalin's security guards looked after Vasily and his sister. With his father frequently absent, Stalin became close to Károly Pauker, a Hungarian who worked as a bodyguard for his father. Pauker frequently travelled out of the Soviet Union and would bring back gifts to the younger Stalin, though during the Great Purge his foreign nationality and excursions made him a target for repression, and he was shot in August 1937. Stalin spent time with other guards as well, and drank with them. He would later reflect that his entire life had been "spent among adults, among guards" and that it left a "deep mark on the whole of [his] private life and character". He tried to gain the attention of his father, writing letters about what he was doing, but the elder Stalin did not reciprocate.

Military service
In 1933 Stalin and his sister were enrolled in Moscow Model School No. 25, a prominent public school. Stalin was a poor student, and Svetlana would recall that the teachers would frequently discuss his poor behavior with his father. He was transferred out of the school in 1937 to the Special School No. 2, though the faculty there did nothing to curtail his behaviour. One year later Stalin, now aged 17, was sent to the Kachinsk Military Aviation School. He had initially wanted to attend an artillery school, but as his half-brother Yakov was already enrolled in one, their father did not want them both in the same military branch. His father ordered the school to not grant him any favours or special privileges  due to his name, and asked that he stay in a regular barracks. Stalin did quite well at the school, with a 1939 report to his father noting he was "[d]edicated to the cause of the Party of Lenin-Stalin", and was "interested and well versed in questions of the international and domestic situation". However, the report also noted Stalin tended to study poorly, was unshaven for duty, and reacted "badly to snafus in flight". He completed his schooling in March 1940, with his final marks stating he did "excellent" and was given the rank of air force lieutenant. On 31 December 1940 he married Galina Burdonskaya, a student at the Moscow State University of Printing Arts, and was also 19-years-old.

The Soviet Union was invaded by Nazi Germany on 22 June 1941, and Stalin was transferred to the front in August 1941 and given the surname Ivanov in an attempt to conceal his identity. As the son of Stalin, he flew in combat rarely, and when he did he was accompanied by a formation. Vasily took part in 29 combat missions, and is said to have shot down two enemy aircraft. As the son of the Soviet leader, Vasily was hated by most of his colleagues, who felt he was an informant to his father. In the spring of 1942 he was sent back to Moscow, and given a role inspecting the conditions of the air force, and mainly stayed in Moscow for the rest of the war. Bored in this role, Vasily was in trouble after a 4 April 1943 incident where he had explosives dropped into the Moskva River, injuring himself and killing the flight engineer.

As a result of the explosion, Vasily was demoted, though within a year and a half he was promoted to command an air division. He was further promoted to general, and at the age of 24 was made the youngest major-general in the Red Army. He was also awarded several decorations, including the Order of Red Banner (twice), the Order of Alexander Nevsky, and the Order of Suvorov. After the war he was transferred to Germany as part of the Soviet occupation.

He was promoted to major-general in 1946, to Lieutenant-General in 1947 and Commander of the Air Forces of the Moscow Military District in 1948.

Post-war
After the war, Vasily took up an interest in sports, in particular ice hockey. He helped develop a team to represent the air force, VVS Moscow, and brought in Anatoly Tarasov as the player-coach for the inaugural season in 1946–47. However, Tarasov argued with Vasily over players and left the team after one season for CDKA Moscow (later CSKA Moscow). On 5 January 1950 a plane carrying the VVS team crashed at Sverdlovsk, killing the team. Even so, VVS won three consecutive Soviet Championship League titles from 1951 to 1953, before Vasily divested himself of the team in the wake of his father's death.

Arrest and imprisonment
Joseph Stalin died on 5 March 1953. Vasily arrived shortly after the death of his father, and in a drunken rage claimed his father had been poisoned. After his father's death, a long period of troubles began for Vasily. The Defense Ministry offered to allow him to take up command of any military district but Moscow, which was the only one he would accept. Denied his choice assignment, Vasily was forced to retire from the military. Less than two months after his father's death, Vasily was arrested on 28 April 1953, because he had visited a restaurant with foreign diplomats. He was charged with denigration of the Soviet Union's leaders, anti-Soviet propaganda and criminal negligence, and sentenced to eight years in prison. The trial was conducted in private and he was denied legal representation; his appeal to the new Soviet leaders, Nikita Khrushchev and Georgy Malenkov, for clemency was unsuccessful. He was imprisoned in the special penitentiary of Vladimir under the name "Vasily Pavlovich Vasilyev". He was released from prison on 11 January 1960. The Central Committee of the Communist Party of the Soviet Union issued him a pension of 300 rubles, an apartment in Moscow, and a three-month treatment vacation in Kislovodsk. He was also granted permission to wear his general's uniform and all of his military medals.

Death

Vasily died on 19 March 1962, due to chronic alcoholism, five days before his 41st birthday, and was buried in Arskoe Cemetery.

Vasily was partially rehabilitated in 1999, when the Military Collegium of the Supreme Court lifted charges of anti-Soviet propaganda that dated from 1953. His body was re-buried next to his fourth wife in a Moscow cemetery in 2002.

Honours and awards
 Soviet Union

 Foreign Awards

References

Bibliography

External links
 Vasiliy Stalin information 
 Photo of Vasily Stalin in 32 GIAP

1921 births
1962 deaths
Alcohol-related deaths in Russia
Burials in Troyekurovskoye Cemetery
Inmates of Vladimir Central Prison
Recipients of the Order of Alexander Nevsky
Recipients of the Order of Suvorov, 2nd class
Recipients of the Order of the Cross of Grunwald, 3rd class
Recipients of the Order of the Red Banner
Soviet World War II pilots
Soviet Air Force generals
Soviet lieutenant generals
Soviet rehabilitations
Children of Joseph Stalin
Military personnel from Moscow